Love You till Tuesday may refer to:

 "Love You till Tuesday" (song), a 1967 song by David Bowie
 Love You till Tuesday (film), a promotional film about David Bowie
 Love You till Tuesday (album), a compilation of material by David Bowie